The smoke point, also referred to as the burning point, is the temperature at which an oil or fat begins to produce a continuous bluish smoke that becomes clearly visible, dependent upon specific and defined conditions. Smoke point values can vary greatly, depending on factors such as the volume of oil utilized, the size of the container, the presence of air currents, the type and source of light as well as the quality of the oil and its acidity content, otherwise known as free fatty acid (FFA) content. The more FFA an oil contains, the quicker it will break down and start smoking. The lower the value of FFA, the higher the smoke point. However, the FFA content typically represents less than 1% of the total oil and consequently renders smoke point a poor indicator of the capacity of a fat or oil to withstand heat.

Temperature
The smoke point of an oil correlates with its level of refinement. Many cooking oils have smoke points above standard home cooking temperatures:

 Pan frying (sauté) on stove top heat: 
 Deep frying: 
 Oven baking: Average of 

Smoke point decreases at different pace in different oils.

Considerably above the temperature of the smoke point is the flash point, the point at which the vapours from the oil can ignite in air, given an ignition source.

The following table presents smoke points of various fats and oils.

Oxidative stability 

Hydrolysis and oxidation are the two primary degradation processes that occur in an oil during cooking. Oxidative stability is how resistant an oil is to reacting with oxygen, breaking down and potentially producing harmful compounds while exposed to continuous heat. Oxidative stability is the best predictor of how an oil behaves during cooking. 

The Rancimat method is one of the most common methods for testing oxidative stability in oils. This determination entails speeding up the oxidation process in the oil (under heat and forced air), which enables its stability to be evaluated by monitoring volatile substances associated with rancidity.  It is measured as "induction time" and recorded as total hours before the oil breaks down. Canola oil requires 7.5 hours, for example, whereas extra virgin olive oil (EVOO) and virgin coconut oil will last over a day at 110 °C of continuous heat. The differing stabilities correlate with lower levels of polyunsaturated fatty acids, which are more prone to oxidation. EVOO is high in monounsaturated fatty acids and antioxidants, conferring stability. Some plant cultivars have been bred to produce "high-oleic" oils with more monounsaturated oleic acid and less polyunsaturated linoleic acid for enhanced stability.

The oxidative stability does not directly correspond to the smoke point and thus the latter cannot be used as a reference for safe and healthy cooking.

See also
 Boiling point
 Combustion
 Drying oil
 Flash point
 Fire point
 Kindling point (Autoignition temperature)

References

External links
 Cooking For Engineers: Smoke Point of Various Fats - another list of smoke points along with some discussion on the subject
 Good Eats: Cooking Oil Smoke Points
 

Chemical properties
Cooking fats
Smoke